Giovanni Giacomo Di Conforto or Giovanni Giacomo Conforto (1569 – June 1630, in Naples) was an Italian architect and engineer, active mainly in Naples, Italy, in a late Mannerist style.

He participated in the construction of many churches in Naples. His projects include Santa Teresa degli Scalzi (or agli Studi) (1602–1612) whose facade was completed by Cosimo Fanzago, Santa Maria della Verità (San Agostino agli Scalzi), as well as rebuilding of the Certosa di San Martino and San Severo al Pendino.

References
Entry in Treccani Encyclopedia

1569 births
1630 deaths
Engineers from Naples
17th-century Italian architects
Architects from Naples